Emma of Altdorf, also known as Hemma ( – 31 January 876), a member of the Elder House of Welf, was Queen consort of East Francia by marriage to King Louis the German, from 843 until her death.

Life 
Her father was Welf I (d. 825), Count of Altorf in Alamannia; her mother was Hedwig (Heilwig; c. 775 – after 833), a daughter of the Saxon count Isambart. Emma's elder sister was Judith, who in February 819 married the Carolingian emperor Louis the Pious, and thereby became Queen consort of the Franks and Holy Roman Empress. The marriage marked a crucial step forward in the rise of the Welf dynasty.

In 827, probably at the instigation of Judith, Hemma married Louis the German, the youngest son of Emperor Louis the Pious from his first marriage with Ermengarde of Hesbaye, and stepson of Hemma's sister Judith. The wedding ceremony possibly took place in Regensburg, where Louis the German resided as King of Bavaria subordinate to his father. In 833, Hemma received Obermünster Abbey in Regensburg from her husband.

Emperor Louis died in 840. After severe innerdynastic struggles, the Carolingian Empire eventually was divided according to the Treaty of Verdun in 843. The Kingdom of Bavaria was merged with Louis the German's Kingdom of East Francia (the predecessor of the Kingdom of Germany), and his wife Hemma became the first East Frankish queen.

Hemma is rarely mentioned in contemporary sources; she does not seem to have had much influence on her husband's rule.  The Annales Bertiniani written by Archbishop Hincmar of Reims however reproach her for a pride which displeased the people of Italy. She is also said to have inordinately favoured her son Carloman, designated heir of his father in Bavaria, which led to a revolt by his brothers. 

Hemma suffered a stroke in 874 and subsequently became paralyzed and speechless; King Louis visited her the last time in 875. She died on 31 January 876, a few months before her husband, and was buried in St. Emmeram's Abbey, Regensburg. Her tomb, erected around 1300, is considered a masterpiece of medieval sculpture.

Family 
By Louis, she had eight children:

Hildegard (827–856)
Carloman (828–880)
Ermengard ( c. 830-866)
Gisela, married to Berctolf, Count of Swabia. Grandmother of Cunigunde of Swabia, wife of Conrad I.
Emma
Louis the Younger (830–882)
Bertha (died 877)
Charles the Fat (839–888)

Her sons became Kings; three of her daughters became nuns.

References

External links

 http://www.france-pittoresque.com/reines-france/emma.htm

|-

Carolingian dynasty
Frankish queens consort
German queens consort
800s births
876 deaths
Year of birth uncertain
Women of medieval Germany
Burials at St. Emmeram's Abbey
9th-century people from East Francia
Women from the Carolingian Empire